Millbrook Magnet High School, commonly known as just Millbrook High School (MHS), is a public magnet high school located in Raleigh, North Carolina.  It is one of thirty-two high schools in the Wake County Public School System. In 2006, Millbrook finished the renovation of its campus which includes a new three-level building, a courtyard for students, and a larger cafeteria making MHS one of the largest and up to date facilities in the area. In 2009, Millbrook High School was granted International Baccalaureate status by the North Carolina Board of Education. The school was named a Magnet School of Excellence by Magnet Schools of America in 2020 and is recognized for its innovative curriculum, community building, and removing barriers to student success.

School Profile

Vision 
Students will leave Millbrook High School well prepared for future endeavors and for the demands of a complex global society.

Mission Statement 
Millbrook High School will graduate students who are collaborative, creative, effective communicators and critical thinkers, who are prepared to engage in their global community.

Value Statements 

 We will provide an inviting environment for students – an environment with clear expectations, consistent consequences, and articulated academic goals
 We will reinforce content and skills in all curricular areas through challenging, engaging, relevant, rigorous and meaningful learning each day
 We will help all students achieve the intended outcome of the curriculum by addressing their individual needs and learning styles, regardless of their socioeconomic status, race, and ethnicity
 We will model the lifelong learning commitment to high-quality work that we hope to develop in our students by working collaboratively in developing instructional strategies and partnering with our community.

Athletics 
Millbrook's athletics department houses 40 athletic teams including varsity, junior varsity, and freshman levels, who all compete in the North Carolina High School Athletic Association. The school is  classified into 4A, the highest division, due to their large population. Their historical rival is Jesse O. Sanderson High School.

Sports Teams 

 Cheer
 Golf (men's & women's)
 Volleyball
 Cross Country (men's & women's)
 Gymnastics
 Soccer (men's & women's)
 Football
 Tennis (men's & women's)
 Basketball (men's & women's)
 Indoor Track (men's & women's)
 Swim & Dive (men's & women's)
 Wrestling (men's & women's)
 Baseball
 Track & Field (men's & women's)
 Softball
 Lacrosse (men's & women's)

Notable alumni
Robert L. Barker, North Carolina Senator
Bucky Brooks, former NFL player who is a sportswriter covering the NFL for Sports Illustrated
Evan Brown, professional soccer player
Chris Clemons, NBA player
Dean Debnam, President and CEO, Public Policy Polling
George A. Fisher Jr., former United States Army officer
Craig Keith, NFL tight end
Everett Lindsay, NFL offensive guard
Keith Marshall, NFL running back
David Merritt, former NFL player and current NFL coach
Brian Miller, MLB outfielder
Martha Nichols, American choreographer and dancer
Larry Rountree III,  NFL running back for the Los Angeles Chargers
Paul Shuey, MLB pitcher
James Smith-Williams, NFL defensive lineman
Ferrety Sousa, professional soccer player
Rickey Thompson, American actor, comedian, and internet personality

References

External links

Official Athletics Website
Millbrook Student Services
School Newspaper
Millbrook High School Band

Wake County Public School System
Public high schools in North Carolina
Schools in Raleigh, North Carolina
Magnet schools in North Carolina
International Baccalaureate schools in North Carolina
1923 establishments in North Carolina